Geovane Silva Santos (born 22 February 1999), simply known as Giva, is a Brazilian footballer who plays as a midfielder for Avaí.

Career statistics

Club

References

External links
Athletico Paranaense profile 

1999 births
Living people
Sportspeople from Goiás
Brazilian footballers
Association football midfielders
Campeonato Brasileiro Série B players
Club Athletico Paranaense players
Associação Atlética Internacional (Limeira) players
Figueirense FC players
Centro Sportivo Alagoano players
Avaí FC players